Tobias Steffen (born 3 June 1992) is a German footballer who plays as an attacking midfielder for Atlas Delmenhorst.

Career
Steffen joined Bayer Leverkusen from VfL Osnabrück in 2009, and was promoted to the reserve team during the 2010–11 season. He made an immediate impact, scoring eight goals in fifteen games, and went on loan to Energie Cottbus of the 2. Bundesliga in July 2011. He made his Cottbus debut as a substitute for Dimitar Rangelov in a 2–0 away win over Alemannia Aachen in August 2008, but only made one other appearance and returned to Leverkusen half-way through the season. For the 2012–13 season he was named as an auxiliary member of the first-team squad, and was named in the starting eleven for a UEFA Europa League tie against Metalist Kharkiv in November 2012.

Steffen left Leverkusen in July 2013, signing for Fortuna Köln. He helped Fortuna win the Regionalliga West title in the 2013–14 season, and promotion to the 3. Liga after a playoff victory over Bayern Munich II before joining Rot-Weiss Essen in July 2014.

References

External links
 

1992 births
Living people
People from Leer
Association football midfielders
German footballers
Footballers from Lower Saxony
FC Energie Cottbus players
FC Energie Cottbus II players
Bayer 04 Leverkusen II players
Bayer 04 Leverkusen players
SC Fortuna Köln players
Rot-Weiss Essen players
BV Cloppenburg players
SV Rödinghausen players
VfB Oldenburg players
Atlas Delmenhorst players
2. Bundesliga players
Regionalliga players